The Blighty Football Netball Club, nicknamed the Redeyes, is an Australian rules football and netball club playing in the Picola & District Football League. Prior to 1969, the club had played in the Coreen & District Football League (1964–68) and the Edward River Football Association (1949–54, 1959–61).

The club is based in the Riverina locality of Blighty, New South Wales.

Premierships

References

External links
Official website (archived)

Picola & District Football League clubs
Australian rules football clubs in New South Wales